Uledi is an unincorporated community in Fayette County, Pennsylvania, United States. Uledi has a post office, with ZIP code 15484, which opened on April 14, 1902.

References

Unincorporated communities in Fayette County, Pennsylvania
Unincorporated communities in Pennsylvania